Peter is a surname which is also a common masculine given name (see here). It is derived, via Latin "petra", from the Greek word πέτρος  (petros) meaning "stone" or "rock".

List of people

 Aaju Peter (born 1960), Inuk lawyer, activist and clothing designer
 Babett Peter (born 1988), German football (soccer) player
 Daniel Peter (1836–1919), Swiss chocolatier and inventor of milk chocolate

 Friedrich Peter (1921–2005), Austrian politician
 Fritz Peter (1899–1949) German mathematician
 Gustav Albert Peter (1853–1937), German botanist
 Henry Peter (born 1957), Swiss Lawyer
 John Peter (disambiguation), several people
 Jomo Kenyatta (around 1894–1978), Kenyan leader, who briefly assumed the name John Peter when he converted to Christianity in 1914
 Philipp Peter (born 1969), Austrian racing car driver
 Rózsa Péter (1905–1977), Hungarian mathematician
 Samuel Peter (born 1980), Nigerian heavyweight boxer
 Werner Peter (born 1950), East German football (soccer) player

References

Surnames from given names